Kawelikoa Point is a large jutting headland on the south-east coast of the island of Kauai in the Hawaiian Islands.

Headlands of Kauai